Mickey Hargitay (January 6, 1926 – September 14, 2006), born Miklós Karoly Hargitay, was a Hungarian-American actor and the 1955 Mr. Universe. 

Born in Budapest, Hargitay moved to the United States in 1947 and eventually became a U.S. citizen. He was married to actress Jayne Mansfield and is the father of actress Mariska Hargitay. During their marriage, Hargitay and Mansfield made four movies together: Will Success Spoil Rock Hunter? (1957), The Loves of Hercules (1960), Promises! Promises! (1963), and Primitive Love (1964).

Early life and early career
Miklós Karoly Hargitay (or Hargitai) was born in Budapest, Hungary on January 6, 1926. He was the son of Ferenc and Mária (Rothsischer) Hargitay (or Hargitai). Hargitay was one of four children of an athletic father. He and his brothers were all brought up as athletes. During his youth, Hargitay was part of an acrobatic act with his brothers. The act was so popular that the brothers performed throughout all Hungary, including the largest opera house in Budapest. After being introduced to the sport by his brother, Hargitay began competing in speed skating. In 1946, he won the Middle European championship at 500 and 1,500 meters, and placed second in the 5,000 meter race. He was also a proficient football player, and was an underground fighter during World War II.

In 1947, aged 21, Hargitay left Hungary to emigrate to the United States to avoid being drafted into military service by the Soviet Union. He settled in Cleveland, where he worked as a plumber and carpenter and also performed in an acrobatic act with his first wife, Mary Birge. He was inspired to begin bodybuilding after seeing a magazine cover featuring Steve Reeves, famed for playing Hercules. Hargitay won the National Amateur Body-Builders' Association (NABBA) Mr. Universe award in 1955.

Hargitay "is credited with stimulating the enormous interest in physical culture prevalent in the US of the Fifties". He appeared as a pin-up model in fitness magazines. After Mae West saw his photo on a magazine cover, Hargitay joined West's muscleman revue.

Acting career

Hargitay's first film role came when Jayne Mansfield demanded that he be cast in her movie, Will Success Spoil Rock Hunter? (1957). The two fell in love and were described as inseparable. 20th Century Fox did not want Hargitay to appear in Rock Hunter because they disliked Mansfield's view of Hargitay as her "only" lover; Fox preferred their sex symbols to be single.

In 1960, Hargitay and Mansfield played the lead roles in The Loves of Hercules. The film was shot in Italy, and has never been released in movie theaters in the United States, though it is available on Netflix under the title Hercules vs. Hydra and under its original title as episode 1108 of Mystery Science Theater 3000 (2017). Over the next four years, Hargitay and Mansfield would appear together in Promises! Promises! (1963) and Primitive Love (1964). In 1965, Hargitay played the lead role in Bloody Pit of Horror without Mansfield.

Hargitay's acting career was not limited to the United States; he also appeared in many Italian productions, and acted in Hungarian director György Szomjas' 1988 film, Mr. Universe.

In 2003, Hargitay guest-starred on Law & Order: Special Victims Unit, the series in which his daughter Mariska stars; he portrayed a witness to a violent crime.

Personal life

Hargitay's first wife was fellow acrobat Mary Birge. Hargitay had a daughter, Tina, with Birge in 1949. Hargitay and Birge later divorced. 

Hargitay and Jayne Mansfield met in 1956 while he was performing in The Mae West Show at the Latin Quarter. When Mansfield noticed Hargitay performing, she allegedly told the waiter, "I'll have a steak and that tall man on the left." The couple married on January 13, 1958. They had three children: Miklós, Zoltán, and Mariska. Mariska Hargitay grew up to be an actress, starring on Law & Order: Special Victims Unit. Hargitay remodeled much of his and Mansfield's Beverly Hills mansion, known as "The Pink Palace", building its famous heart-shaped swimming pool. In November 2002, the house was razed by developers who had purchased it from Engelbert Humperdinck.

In May 1963, Hargitay and Mansfield filed for divorce in Ciudad Juárez. The divorce was ruled invalid, and the two reconciled in October 1963. After Mariska's birth, Mansfield sued for the Juárez divorce to be declared legal, and ultimately won. The divorce was recognized in the United States on August 26, 1964. After Mansfield's death in a car crash on June 29, 1967, Hargitay sued Mansfield's estate for over $5,000 to support the children. In their divorce decree, Mansfield had agreed to pay child support, as well as to give Hargitay approximately $70,000 in cash and property.

Hargitay married Ellen Siano on April 14th, 1968. Hargitay and Siano remained married until his death.

Death
On September 14, 2006, Hargitay died in Los Angeles, California, aged 80, from multiple myeloma. In Hargitay's obituary, the Los Angeles Times quoted bodybuilding historian Gene Mozee as stating the following: "Walter Winchell once said that what [President] Eisenhower did for golf, Mickey Hargitay did for bodybuilding, because he brought it to the forefront... Back in those days, bodybuilding was thought of as a freakish, unusual activity that wasn't popular with the general public... At that time, athletic coaches discouraged lifting weights, thinking you'd become musclebound. And along came Mickey Hargitay, a great all-around athlete".

In popular culture
Hargitay was portrayed by Arnold Schwarzenegger in the 1980 television film The Jayne Mansfield Story.

Filmography

Film

Television

References and footnotes

External links

1926 births
2006 deaths
Hungarian emigrants to the United States
Hungarian bodybuilders
Deaths from multiple myeloma
Deaths from cancer in California
20th-century American male actors
21st-century American male actors
Male actors from Budapest
Hungarian resistance members
American male film actors
American male television actors
Naturalized citizens of the United States
People associated with physical culture
Jayne Mansfield
United Service Organizations entertainers